Prague 22, also known as Uhříněves, is a municipal district (městská část) in Prague, Czech Republic. It is located in the south eastern part of the city.

The administrative district (správní obvod) of the same name comprises municipal districts Prague 22, Benice, Kolovraty, Královice and Nedvězí.

Uhříněves is home to the largest freight railway container terminal in Central Europe.

See also

FC Čechie Uhříněves

References

External links 
 Prague 22 - Official homepage

Districts of Prague